Gonystylus maingayi is a tree in the family Thymelaeaceae.

Description
Its bark is grey to brown.

Distribution and habitat
Gonystylus maingayi is native to Sumatra, Peninsular Malaysia, Singapore and Borneo. Its habitat is swamp forests to  altitude.

References

maingayi
Trees of Sumatra
Trees of Malaya
Trees of Borneo
Plants described in 1886
Taxa named by Joseph Dalton Hooker